Chryseobacterium sediminis  is a Gram-negative and rod-shaped bacteria from the genus of Chryseobacterium which has been isolated from river sediments in Guyana.

References

External links
Type strain of Chryseobacterium sediminis at BacDive -  the Bacterial Diversity Metadatabase

sediminis
Bacteria described in 2015